The Mercedes D.IV was an eight-cylinder, liquid-cooled inline aircraft engine built by Daimler Motoren Gesellschaft (DMG) and used on a small number of German aircraft during World War I.

Design and development
The design was based around the pistons of the ubiquitous D.III 6-cylinder design and developed 162 kW (217 hp), making it a Class IV motor under the IdFlieg classification system then in use in Imperial Germany. It also employed reduction gearing. When the reliability of the engine proved disappointing, it was supplanted in production by the unrelated six-cylinder Mercedes D.IVa. Specifically, the long crankshaft used in extending the original straight-six design to a straight-eight proved susceptible to breakage.

Applications

 AEG C.V
 AEG G.III
 AEG R.I
 AGO C.II
 AGO C.VIII
 Albatros C.V
 DFW R.I
 Gotha G.II
 LVG C.IV

Specifications

See also

References
 Kroschel, Gunter and Helmust Stützer. (1977) Die deutschen Militarflugzeuge 1910-1918 Wilhelmshaven: Lohse-Eissing Mittler.

Further reading

External links

 wwiaviation.com

Mercedes aircraft engines
1910s aircraft piston engines